The Commercial Historic District in Pikeville, Kentucky, located at Main St. and Division Ave., is a  historic district which was listed on the National Register of Historic Places in 1984.  It included 10 contributing buildings and 12 non-contributing buildings.

It includes the four-story Pikeville Drug/Anthony Hotel building, built between 1920 and 1925.

References

Historic districts on the National Register of Historic Places in Kentucky
National Register of Historic Places in Pike County, Kentucky
Commercial buildings on the National Register of Historic Places in Kentucky
Commercial Historic District